This is not to be confused with other intermittent watercourses, in Arizona, in Colorado, and in New Mexico and Texas, also using the Carrizo name. For others see Carrizo Creek and Carrizo Wash (disambiguation).

The Carrizo Creek and Carrizo Wash in California are a stream and an arroyo that the stream flows into, in San Diego County, California and Imperial County, California.

The stream, Carrizo Creek, arises in the mountains of San Diego County, California, and terminates in Carrizo Wash in Imperial County, a tributary in turn to San Felipe Creek that terminates in the Salton Sea.

History
Carrizo Creek, its wash and its tributary, Vallecito Creek, were the watercourses that carved the pathway from the Peninsular Ranges of Southern California through the Carrizo Badlands to the Colorado Desert. They provided a pathway and water for Native Americans travelers out into the desert and on to the Colorado River along the course of the distributary New or Alamo Rivers. Subsequently, from 1828 it was similarly used by Mexican travelers on the route of the Sonora Road to Alta California, then by Americans on Cooke's Wagon Road and its successor the Southern Emigrant Trail. It was the route taken into California by the San Antonio-San Diego Mail Line and Overland Mail Company. Both companies used the Carrizo Creek Station at the lower end if the creek in the badlands.

Carrizo Wash

References

Rivers of San Diego County, California
Rivers of Imperial County, California
Anza-Borrego Desert State Park
Rivers of Southern California